Liu Zhi (fl. 8th century), courtesy name Zuoqing (柞卿), was a Chinese historian during the Tang dynasty and author of the Zhengdian. He was the fourth son of Liu Zhiji, little is known about his life, other than he was an official during the reign of Emperor Xuanzong of Tang and had been deposed on several occasions until the times of Emperor Suzong of Tang before his death.

References 
 Yang, Xumin. Lun Liu Zhi (On Liu Zhi). Huaihai Wenhui. 2002.2. p. 32-36.

life of liu zhi

Tang dynasty politicians
Tang dynasty historians
8th-century Chinese historians
Year of birth unknown
Year of death unknown